Laila Seysembekovna Akhmetova (born 12 February 1954) is a Kazakh doctor of historical sciences, professor of politology of Al-Farabi Kazakh National University, writer and research of participants in the World War II.

Current activity 

Akhmetova is the Director of UNESCO centre of Al-Farabi Kazakh National University.

She is also the President of the ULE "Almaty confederation of non-governmental organizations nicknamed "Ariptes".

The women's trade union movement in Kazakhstan is inextricably linked to the name of L.S. Akhmetova. She is the chairman of the Commission on Women Workers, a part of the Trade Union Federation of Kazakhstan. She is an active participant in the women's network of the International Trade Unions Confederation. Currently, under the leadership of L.S. Akhmetova, the Commission is actively working on the issues of women workers, labour and safety, maternity and health of women, family and children, leisure and welfare.

In addition, she is a member of the National Coordinating Council for combatting the worst forms of child labour under the Ministry of Social Development of Kazakhstan as well as the Deputy Chairman (2008–2011) and member (2011–current time) of the Almaty City Council for Cooperation and Interaction with non-governmental organizations under the Akimat of Almaty. She is also involved with the NGO Council under the Government of Kazakhstan.

Major works

Awards 
 Commemorative Sign of the United Nations Children's Fund for a special contribution to the improvement of the situation of children and the protection of their rights in the Republic of Kazakhstan (2007)
 The Order of Kurmet (2011)

References 

1954 births
People from Almaty
Kazakhstani historians
Al-Farabi Kazakh National University alumni
Living people